Leslie Alvin White (January 19, 1900, Salida, Colorado – March 31, 1975, Lone Pine, California) was an American anthropologist known for his advocacy of the theories on cultural evolution, sociocultural evolution, and especially neoevolutionism, and for his role in creating the department of anthropology at the University of Michigan Ann Arbor. White was president of the American Anthropological Association (1964).

Early years

White lived first in Kansas and then Louisiana. He volunteered to fight in World War I, serving in the US Navy before enrolling at Louisiana State University in 1919. In 1921, he transferred to Columbia University, where he studied psychology, receiving a B.A. in 1923 and a M.A. in 1924. His Ph.D in Anthropology and Sociology came from the University of Chicago(1925).

White studied at Columbia, where Franz Boas had lectured, however he supported cultural evolution as defined by writers such as Lewis. H Morgan and Edward Tylor. White's interests were diverse, and he took classes in several other disciplines, including philosophy at UCLA, and clinical psychiatry, before discovering anthropology via Alexander Goldenweiser courses at the New School for Social Research. White also spent a few weeks with the Menominee and Winnebago in Wisconsin during his Ph.D. His thesis proposal was a library thesis, which foreshadowed his later theoretical work. He conducted fieldwork at Acoma Pueblo, New Mexico.

In 1927 White began teaching at the University at Buffalo.

Buffalo transition
Teaching at University of Buffalo marked a turning point in White's thinking. It was here that he developed a worldview—anthropological, political, ethical—that he would hold to and advocate until his death. White developed an interest in Marxism In 1929, he visited the Soviet Union and on his return joined the Socialist Labor Party, writing articles under the pseudonym "John Steel" for their newspaper.

White went to Michigan when he was hired to replace Julian Steward, who departed Ann Arbor in 1930. Although the university was home to a museum with a long history of involvement in matters anthropological, White was the only professor in the anthropology department itself. He remained here for the rest of his active career. In 1932, he headed a field school in the southwest which was attended by Fred Eggan, Mischa Titiev, and others.

White brought Titiev, his student and a Russian immigrant, to Michigan as a second professor in 1936. However, during the Second World War, Titiev took part in the war effort by studying Japan. Perhaps this upset the socialist White. In any case by war's end White had broken with Titiev, who would go on to found the East Asian Studies Program, and the two were hardly even on speaking terms. No other faculty members were hired until after the war, when scholars like Richard K. Beardsley joined the department. Most would fall on side or the other of the split between White and Titiev.

As a professor in Ann Arbor, White trained a students such as Robert Carneiro, Beth Dillingham, and Gertrude Dole carried on White's program in its orthodox form, other scholars such as Eric Wolf, Arthur Jelinek, Elman Service, and Marshall Sahlins and Napoleon Chagnon drew on their time with White to elaborate their own forms of anthropology.

White's anthropology
Over time, White's views became framed in opposition to that of Boasians, with whom he was institutionally at odds. This could take on personal overtones: White referred to Boas's prose style as "corny" in the American Journal of Sociology. Robert Lowie, a proponent of Boas's work, referred to White's work as "a farrago of immature metaphysical notions", shaped by "the obsessive power of fanaticism [which] unconsciously warps one's vision."

One of White's strongest deviations from Boas's philosophy was a view of the nature of anthropology and its relation to other sciences. White understood the world to be divided into cultural, biological, and physical levels of phenomena. Such a division is a reflection of the composition of the universe and was not a heuristic device. Thus, contrary to Alfred L. Kroeber, Kluckhohn, and Edward Sapir, White saw the delineation of the object of study not as a cognitive accomplishment of the anthropologist, but as a recognition of the actually existing and delineated phenomena which comprise the world. The distinction between 'natural' and 'social' sciences was thus based not on method, but on the nature of the object of study: physicists study physical phenomena, biologists biological phenomena, and culturologists (White's term) cultural phenomena.

The object of study was not delineated by the researcher's viewpoint or interest, but the method by which he approached them could be. White believed that phenomena could be explored from three different points of view: the historical, the formal-functional, and the evolutionist (or formal-temporal). The historical view was dedicated to examining the particular diachronic cultural processes, "lovingly trying to penetrate into its secrets until every feature is plain and clear." The formal-functional is essentially the synchronic approach advocated by Alfred Radcliffe-Brown and Bronisław Malinowski, attempting to discern the formal structure of a society and the functional interrelations of its components. The evolutionist approach is, like the formal approach, generalizing; but it is also diachronic, seeing particular events as general instances of larger trends.

Boas claimed his science promised complex and interdependent visions of culture, but White thought that it would delegitimize anthropology if it became the dominant position, removing it from broader discourses on science. White viewed his own approach as a synthesis of historical and functional approach because it combined the diachronic scope of one with the generalizing eye for formal interrelations provided by the other. As such, it could point out "the course of cultural development in the past and its probable course in the future" a task that was anthropology's "most valuable function".

This stance can be seen in his views of evolution, which are firmly rooted in the writings of Herbert Spencer, Charles Darwin, and Lewis H. Morgan. While it can be argued that White's exposition of Morgan and Spencer's was tendentious, it can be safely said that White's concepts of science and evolution were firmly rooted in their work. Advances in population biology and evolutionary theory passed White by and, unlike Steward, his conception of evolution and progress remained firmly rooted in the nineteenth century.

For White, culture was a superorganic entity that was sui generis and could be explained only in terms of itself. It was composed of three levels: the technological, the social organizational, and the ideological. Each level rested on the previous one, and although they all interacted, ultimately the technological level was the determining one, what White calls "The hero of our piece" and "the leading character of our play". The most important factor in his theory is technology: "Social systems are determined by technological systems", wrote White in his book, echoing the earlier theory of Lewis Henry Morgan.

White spoke of culture as a general human phenomenon, and claimed not to speak of 'cultures' in the plural. His theory, published in 1959 in The Evolution of Culture: The Development of Civilization to the Fall of Rome, rekindled the interest in social evolutionism and is counted prominently among the neoevolutionists. He believed that culture–meaning the total of all human cultural activity on the planet–was evolving. White differentiated three components of culture: technological, sociological, and ideological. He argued that it was the technological component which plays a primary role or is the primary determining factor responsible for the cultural evolution. His materialist approach is evident in the following quote: "man as an animal species, and consequently culture as a whole, is dependent upon the material, mechanical means of adjustment to the natural environment". This technological component can be described as material, mechanical, physical, and chemical instruments, as well as the way people use these techniques. White's argument on the importance of technology goes as follows:
 Technology is an attempt to solve the problems of survival.
 This attempt ultimately means capturing enough energy and diverting it for human needs.
 Societies that capture more energy and use it more efficiently have an advantage over other societies.
 Therefore, these different societies are more advanced in an evolutionary sense.

For White "the primary function of culture" and the one that determines its level of advancement is its ability to "harness and control energy." White's law states that the measure by which to judge the relative degree of evolvedness of culture was the amount of energy it could capture (energy consumption).

White differentiates between five stages of human development. At first, people use the energy of their own muscles. Second, they use the energy of domesticated animals. Third, they use the energy of plants (so White refers to agricultural revolution here). Fourth, they learn to use the energy of natural resources: coal, oil, gas. Fifth, they harness nuclear energy. White introduced a formula,

P = ET,

where E is a measure of energy consumed per capita per year, T is the measure of efficiency in utilising energy harnessed, and P represents the degree of cultural development in terms of product produced. In his own words: "the basic law of cultural evolution" was "culture evolves as the amount of energy harnessed per capita per year is increased, or as the efficiency of the instrumental means of putting the energy to work is increased". Therefore, "we find that progress and development are effected by the improvement of the mechanical means with which energy is harnessed and put to work as well as by increasing the amounts of energy employed". Although White stops short of promising that technology is the panacea for all the problems that affect mankind, like technological utopians do, his theory treats the technological factor as the most important factor in the evolution of society and is similar to ideas in the later works of Gerhard Lenski, the theory of the Kardashev scale, and some notions of technological singularity.

Selected publications
 Ethnological Essays: Selected Essays of Leslie A. White. University of New Mexico Press. 1987.
 The Evolution of Culture: The Development of Civilization to the Fall of Rome. 1959.
 The Science of Culture: A study of man and civilization. Farrar, Straus and Giroux, 1949.
 The Pueblo of Santa Ana, New Mexico. American Anthropological Association Memoir 60, 1949.
 The Pueblo of San Felipe. American Anthropological Association Memoir No. 38, 1938.
 The Pueblo of Santo Domingo. American Anthropological Association Memoir 60, 1935.
 The Acoma Indians. Bureau of American Ethnology, 47th annual report, pp. 1–192. Smithsonian Institution, 1932.

See also
 List of important publications in anthropology

References

Further reading
 Leslie A. White: Evolution and Revolution in Anthropology by William Peace. University of Nebraska Press, 2004 (the definitive biography of White).
 Richard Beardsley. An appraisal of Leslie A. White's scholarly influence. American Anthropologist 78:617–620, 1976.
 Jerry D. Moore. Leslie White: Evolution Emergent. Chapter 13 of Visions of Culture. pp. 169–180. AltaMira, 1997.
 
 Elman Service. Leslie Alvin White, 1900–1975. American Anthropologist 78:612–617, 1976.
 The Leslie White Papers - Finding guide and information about Leslie White's papers at the Bentley Historical library.

Columbia College (New York) alumni
University at Buffalo alumni
1900 births
1975 deaths
People from Salida, Colorado
University of Michigan faculty
Neoevolutionists
20th-century American anthropologists
Theoretical historians